= 12/4 =

12/4 may refer to:

- December 4 (month-day date notation)
- April 12 (day-month date notation)
- 12 shillings and 4 pence in UK predecimal currency

== See also ==
- 4/12 (disambiguation)
