= 4/12 =

4/12 may refer to:

- April 12 (month-day date notation)
- December 4 (day-month date notation)
